Lauda Sion (foaled 2 February 2017) is a Japanese Thoroughbred racehorse. He showed promise as a two-year-old in 2019 when he won two of four races and finished third in the Kokura Nisai Stakes. In the following year he won the Crocus Stakes and ran second in the Falcon Stakes before taking the Grade 1 NHK Mile Cup.

Background
Lauda Sion is a bay colt with a small white star and white socks on his hind legs bred in Japan by the Shadai Corporation's Shiraoi Farm. He entered the ownership of Silk Racing was sent into training with Takashi Saito. The colt's name is derived from Lauda Sion, a Christian hymn written by Thomas Aquinas.

He was from the first crop of foals sired by Real Impact who won the Yasuda Kinen in Japan and the George Ryder Stakes in Australia. Lauda Sion's dam, the Kentucky-bred Antiphona, showed modest racing ability winning one minor race from six starts in Japan. She was a great-granddaughter of the broodmare Carol's Christmas (foaled 1977) whose other descendants have included Olympio (Hollywood Derby), Pyro and Tapizar.

Racing career

2019: two-year-old season
Lauda Sion made a successful racecourse debut at Hanshin Racecourse on 22 June when he won an event for previously unraced juveniles over 1200 metres of firm ground. After an absence of over two months he returned to the track and was stepped up in class to contest the Grade 3 Kokura Nisai Stakes over 1200 metres at Kokura Racecourse and started at odds of 7.5/1 in a fourteen-runner field. Ridden by Yutaka Take he finished third behind Meiner Grit and Triple Ace, beaten a neck and half a length. On 12 October over 1400 metres on heavy ground at Kyoto Racecourse the colt was ridden by Christophe Lemaire when he started favourite for the Momiji Stakes and won by one and a half lengths from Lotus Land. For his final run of the season Lauda Sion was moved up to the highest class for the Grade 1 Asahi Hai Futurity Stakes over 1600 metres at Hanshin on 15 December and went off a 17/1 outsider. Before the race Saito said "He has been a little unruly in the gate previously, so he has had practice with this and getting a good start, and he does seem more relaxed now... The horse generally gives everything he's got, and having raced at Hanshin before, I’m looking forward to what he can do here". In the event, Lauda Sion was never in serious contention and came home eighth of the sixteen runners, six and a quarter lengths behind the winner Salios.

In the official Japanese rankings for two-year-olds of 2019, Lauda Sion was given a rating of 103, making him the 28th best juvenile colt of the year.

2020: three-year-old season
On 1 February Lauda Sion began his second campaign in the Listed Crocus Stakes over 1400 metres at Tokyo Racecourse and started the 4.5/1 third favourite behind Absolutismo and Armbrust. Partnered by Take he led from the start and won by two lengths from Harmony Magellan with Zenno Justa one and a quarter lengths back in third. On 14 March the colt started the 1.7/1 favourite for the Grade 3 Falcon Stakes over 1400 metres at Chukyo Racecourse and finished second, beaten one and a half lengths by Shine Garnet.

In the Grade 1 NHK Mile Cup at Tokyo on 10 May Lauda Sion was ridden by Mirco Demuro and started at odds of 28.6/1 in an eighteen-runner field. Before the race Saito commented "It's a stretch, but I think he can handle 1,600 meters. He's more settled than he was before, a lot more mature and his balance is good now too. I think he can wait patiently enough. The competition is tough but I'm hoping he'll run a good race". The filly Resistencia started favourite while the other contenders included Taisei Vision (Arlington Cup), Satono Impresa (Mainichi Hai), Luftstrom (New Zealand Trophy), Shine Garnet and Harmony Magellan. Lauda Sion broke quickly and settled in second place behind Resistencia before moving ahead of the filly in the straight. He drew away in the closing stages to win by one and a half lengths from Resistenceia with another filly, Gilded Mirror, taking third ahead of Taisei Vision. After the race Demuro said "I knew that the track today ran better for front runners, and considering that he's usually an evenly-paced colt, I planned to keep him well up in front. He's always quick out of the gate so we were able to secure a good position and I felt he had plenty to outrun [Resistencia] in the final stages."

Lauda Sion returned to the track after an absence of over five months in the Grade 2 Fuji Stakes over 1600 metres at Tokyo on 24 October. He raced in third place for most of the way he took the lead in the straight but was overtaken in the closing stages and beaten one and a quarter lengths into second place by the four-year-old Vin de Garde. The colt then contested the Mile Championship over the same distance at Hanshin on 22 November but after tracking the leader Resistencia and turning into the straight in second place he faded badly in the closing stages and finished unplaced behind Gran Alegria.

Pedigree

References

2017 racehorse births
Racehorses bred in Japan
Racehorses trained in Japan
Thoroughbred family 8-d